Michael Sippel (born 1 November 1975) is an Australian cricketer. He played in two List A matches for Queensland in 2001/02.

See also
 List of Queensland first-class cricketers

References

External links
 

1975 births
Living people
Australian cricketers
Queensland cricketers
Cricketers from Queensland